Laugarvatnsvegur or Route 37 is a primary road in southern Iceland. It is a spur route of Route 35 that connects Laugarvatn to the main road network.

References

Roads in Iceland